Meander River may refer to:

 Meander River (also Maeander), a historical name for the Büyük Menderes River in Turkey
Küçük Menderes ("Little Meander"), a river located south of İzmir, Turkey
 Meander River (Tasmania), a river of Tasmania, Australia
 Meander River, Alberta, a settlement in Alberta, Canada

See also
 Meander (disambiguation)